Zuhres or Zugres is a city in Khartsyzk municipality in Donetsk Oblast, Ukraine.

The city has a population of 

It is currently occupied by Russian armed forces and forces of the de facto Donetsk People's Republic.

History 
The history of the city starts with the decision to built near a settlement Zuyivka a thermal power plant as part of the Soviet GOELRO plan in 1929. The name for the new settlement around the plant was given after the plant as "ZuHRES", Zuyivka Government Raion Electrical Station. The first power plant was built in 1932 and later there was built another plant in 1980s.

During WWII, the Germans occupied the town and murdered local Jews as well as communists in mass executions in a ravine outside the city.

Since 2014, Zuhres has been administered as a part of the de facto Donetsk People's Republic.

Gallery

References

Cities in Donetsk Oblast
Populated places established in the Ukrainian Soviet Socialist Republic
Cities of district significance in Ukraine
Donetsk Raion